Joaquín Naid Sebastián Abdala Astudillo (born 19 January 2000) is a professional footballer who plays as a midfielder for Shabab Al-Khalil in the West Bank Premier League. Born in Chile, he has been called up to the Palestine national team.

Club career
Having played at the Fútbol Joven (Youth Football) level for Huachipato, he joined Coquimbo Unido on 2020 season. On 6 December 2020, he was confirmed as new player of Independiente de Cauquenes.

In November 2022, he moved to Palestine and joined Shabab Al-Khalil in the West Bank Premier League.

International career
In 2022, Abadala was called up to the Palestine national team for the 2023 AFC Asian Cup qualifiers in June.

Personal life
Abadala is the son of the former Palestine international footballer Edgardo Abdala.

Career statistics

Club

Honours
Coquimbo Unido
 Primera B (1): 2021

References

External links
 

2000 births
Living people
People from Bío Bío Province
Chilean people of Palestinian descent
Chilean footballers
Citizens of the State of Palestine through descent
Palestinian footballers
Coquimbo Unido footballers
Independiente de Cauquenes footballers
Trasandino footballers
Shabab Al-Khalil SC players
Chilean Primera División players
Segunda División Profesional de Chile players
Primera B de Chile players
West Bank Premier League players
Association football midfielders